Javier Gándara Magaña (b. Hermosillo, Sonora, Mexico 23 November 1944) is a Sonoran businessman and politician. He is a member of the Partido Acción Nacional (PAN). He was president of the municipal government of Hermosillo from 2009-2012. He serves as the Sonoran government candidate for PAN.

Career

He graduated in Business Studies at the Instituto Tecnológico Autónomo de México (ITAM). He began his business career at Autos Kino S.A.He joined the board of the parent company Gemso. In 1997 he created Grupo Ganfer, a business group composed of agricultural industries, commercial and real estate businesses. Grupo Ganfer became one of the most important business groups in northeast Mexico, encompassing food companies, franchises, greenhouses, agricultural and real estate businesses. He was recognized as Businessman of the Year in 1992, Economic Promoter of Sonora in 2000, and Industria Maquiladora de Sonora.

Philanthropy

In 1991 Gándara Magaña and his wife Marcela Fernández de Gándara, created a programme called "One Step at a Time", the first programme of the Ganfer Foundation, a private organisation that has as its principal objectives the support of young people and the prevention of alcohol and drug addiction, support for women, youngsters and girls for their overall development.

It supports indigenous groups in the State of Sonora, offering special support for young people with grants for study and sports projects as well as people with disabilities and seniors. Programmes include "Ganfer Fleamarket" (El Mercadito Ganfer), offer subsidized commodities in places where impoverished families live and "Entrepreneur Challenge" (Desafío Emprendedor), a competitive programme to promote Sonoran entrepreneurial talent together with Angel Ventures of México. The latter competition was won by a system to convert conventional television sets to smart televisions.

Personal life

Gándara Magaña married Marcela Fernández de Gándara, in 1972. They raised six children: Javier, Luisa Alejandra, Germán, Ana Marcela, Gerardo and Adreana.

See also
 List of municipal presidents of Hermosillo

References

Politicians from Sonora
People from Hermosillo
Instituto Tecnológico Autónomo de México alumni
1944 births
Living people
Municipal presidents in Sonora
21st-century Mexican politicians